Mount Zion Faith Ministries is a Christian film production company based in Ibadan, Nigeria, which casts, produces and distributes Christian films and drama films. It was founded on 5 August 1985 by the Christian writers and actors Mike Bamiloye and Gloria Bamiloye, and comprises Christians from several countries who work in to promote Christian teaching through motion pictures.

On July 11, 1986, the ministry staged its first play in St. Margaret Girl's school, Ilesha. In 1987, Mike Bamiloye resigned so he could concentrate on Mount Zion Faith Ministries. 

The first film produced by Mount Zion Faith Ministries was "The Unprofitable Servant" in 1990. Since then it has produced more than 200 films, including Ide Esu, The Beginning of The End, Perilous Times, Abattoir, House on Fire, One Careless Night, and Agbara Nla.

References

External links

Film production companies of Nigeria
Nigerian companies established in 1985